Vadla Ramapuram is a small village in the mandal of Atmakur, Kurnool district in Andhra Pradesh state of India.

Etymology
"Vadla" in its name derives from the fact that it is famous for paddy in that region.

References

Villages in Kurnool district